Jamaat Ansarullah, also known as the Tajikistani Taliban, is a Tajik Islamist militant movement currently based out of Badakhshan, Afghanistan. It is related to al-Qaeda.

History 
Jamaat Ansarullah was founded in 2006 under the leadership of Amriddin Tabarov which was composed of Islamist and opposition members who refused to accept the 1997 armistice ending the Tajik Civil War. It gained prominence in 2010 when it perpetrated a suicide bombing in the city Khujand, Tajikistan targeting a police station. Three were killed and 25 were wounded. The group was banned by the Tajik government in 2012.

In 2015, the group's founder was killed by the Afghan National Security Forces. He would be succeeded by the son of one of his closest associates, Muhammad Shafirov, who is better known as Mahdi Arsalon.

During the 2021 summer offensive, the Afghan Taliban gave the Tajiki Taliban, and by extension Arsalon, security control over five districts in northern Badakhshan province.

In September 2021, Arsalon was reportedly planning to invade Tajikistan and consulted the Taliban Islamic Movement for operational guidance.

Manpower and recruitment 
Much of them are the children and relatives of the original generation of fighters. Other reports indicate it has less than 100 fighters.

Ansarullah also recruits from Afghanistan, Tajikistan, Pakistan, Central Asia, and Russia. The individual who perpetrated the 2010 suicide bombing of a police station in Khujand was reported to have been trained in an al-Qaeda training camp.

Actions 
The Tajik Taliban has operated out of northern Afghanistan since its founding receiving support from the Taliban and Islamic Movement of Uzbekistan. The group currently serves as border guards in northern Badakhshan Province, being responsible for handling security by the Islamic Emirate of Afghanistan for Kuf Ab, Khwahan, Maimay, Nusay, and Shekay. They also control Jawand and Ab Kamari in Badghis Province.

After building the watch tower, Tajikistan began taking the group seriously. The group spray painted "Mehdi Arsalon" in Badakhshan, Afghanistan, in a large font, which was visible from Tajikistan's autonomous Gorno-Badakhshan region. Tajikistani Taliban members and supporters, all of which are Tajik citizens, walked demonstratively along the Afghan side of the Panj River that separates Afghanistan and Tajikistan. It was reported that they came almost every day to their watch tower and yell threats with a loudspeaker insulting the Tajikistani authorities. Tensions were already high with the Afghan Taliban and Tajikistan due to Tajikistan supporting the Northern Alliance and the NRF, and Tajikistani authorities stated that the Taliban allowing the group to stay active and threaten Tajikistan increases distrust and makes them feel threatened, although the Taliban spokesman Zabiullah Mujahid said in a speech that no threats will be made from Afghanistan to any neighboring countries, and that it was a case of a warlord abusing his power, and he called on Tajik government to cooperate with them to tackle the issue.

Aims and objectives 
The group aims to overthrow the current Tajik government and replace it with an Islamic state governed by Sharia law. In 2011, it issued a series of videos stating that Muslims who observed Salah and fasted but still supported democracy were infidels, and that God is killing unbelievers through them, therefore, they are blessed.

Ideology 
The organisation along with other jihadist groups such as the Afghan Taliban, Pakistani Taliban, Al-Qaeda and the Turkistan Islamic Party had similar motivations and goals. The organisation aims to spread Islamic extremism to enforce Afghan Taliban-style fundamentalist Islam and Sharia law in Tajikistan and turn Tajikistan into an Islamic Emirate similar to Afghanistan.

References

2006 establishments in Afghanistan
Anti-Iranian sentiments
Anti-communist terrorism
Deobandi organisations
Far-right politics in Asia
Theocrats
Organizations designated as terrorist by Tajikistan
Groups affiliated with al-Qaeda